Chavira is a surname. Notable people with the surname include: 

Ignacio Chavira (born 1936), Mexican basketball player
Itan Chavira (born 1987), American ice hockey player
Javier Lozano Chavira (born 1971), Mexican footballer
Ricardo Antonio Chavira (born 1971), American actor